Carpignano Sesia railway station is a railway station serving the comune of Carpignano Sesia, in the Piedmont region, northwestern Italy. The station is located on the Biella–Novara railway. The train services are operated by Trenitalia.

The station is currently managed by Rete Ferroviaria Italiana (RFI), a subsidiary of Ferrovie dello Stato (FS), Italy's state-owned rail company.

History
The line was opened on 18 May 1939, becoming however the station only become operational on 20 July 1940 because of the need to complete several systems and a lack of rolling stock. It was originally equipped with two tracks.

From 21 January 1961, in advance to the end of the concession to the "Società Ferrovia Biella-Novara (SFBN)" company, the management of the railway line passed to the state and the operation of the station was assumed by Ferrovie dello Stato.

From 1992 the station was declassified to a railway stop, and remains in operation, but with only one track and one platform.

In the year 2000, the plant management passed to Rete Ferroviaria Italiana, which is classified in the category "Bronze".

Train services
The station is served by the following service(s):

Regional services (Treno regionale) Biella San Paolo - Rovasenda - Novara

Gallery

See also

 History of rail transport in Italy
 List of railway stations in Piedmont
 Rail transport in Italy
 Railway stations in Italy

References

External links

Carpignano Sesia
Railway stations in Piedmont
Railway stations opened in 1939